A sky pirate is a speculative fiction stock character who conducts piracy from an aircraft or airship.
Sky Pirate may also refer to:

Aviation
A person that carries out a skyjack, the hijacking of an aircraft
Douglas XTB2D Skypirate, an experimental military aircraft

Novels
The Sky Pirate (novel), a novel by Garrett P. Serviss published in 1909 in the periodical Scrapbook
Sky Pirates!, a 1995 novel written by Dave Stone and based on the television series Doctor Who
Sky Pirates of Callisto, a 1973 novel written by Lin Carter, the third in his Callisto series
The Last of the Sky Pirates, a 2002 novel by Paul Stewart and Chris Riddell, the fifth volume of The Edge Chronicles and the first of the Rook Saga trilogy

Film
The Sky Pirate (film), a 1914 American short comedy film directed by and starring Roscoe "Fatty" Arbuckle
Sky Pirates, a 1986 Australian adventure film written and produced by John D. Lamond, and directed by Colin Eggleston, also titled Dakota Harris

Music
Sky Pirates: Original Soundtrack Recording (1989 album), soundtrack album to the 1986 film
Skypirate (1998 song), hiphop song by Sonic Sum

Other uses
The Sky Pirate, a DC Comics villain and enemy of the Green Lantern, who first appeared in the 1947 comic Green Lantern Vol 1 #27
The Sky Pirates, the Japanese professional wrestling tag team of Kairi Sane and Io Shirai
space pirate

See also
 
Air pirate (disambiguation)
Pirate (disambiguation)
Sky (disambiguation)
Sky Bandits (disambiguation)
Skyjacker (disambiguation)
Space Pirate (disambiguation)
Skyjacked (disambiguation)
Skyjack (disambiguation)